The 1962 Chatham Cup was the 35th annual nationwide knockout football competition in New Zealand.

The competition was run on a regional basis, with regional associations each holding separate qualifying rounds. Other teams known to have taken part in the final rounds included North Shore United, Blockhouse Bay, Eastern Suburbs, Mt Wellington (Auckland) Kahukura (Rotorua), Whakatane Town, Riverina (Gisborne), Hastings City, Wanganui Athletic, St. Andrews (Manawatu), Moturoa AFC (New Plymouth), Seatoun AFC, Northern (Wellington), Nelson Rangers, Western AFC (Christchurch), Northern AFC, Timaru Thistle, Invercargill Thistle.

The 1962 final
Hamilton Technical Old Boys, captained by Arthur Leong, became the first team from outside the four main centres to win the cup. Technical Old Boys road to the 1962 final saw wins against Huntly Thistle 2 - 1, Whakatane Town 11 - 2, Kahukura Crusaders 8 - 1, North Shore United 4 - 2 and Moturoa 4 - 0.

The Northern side contained three brothers - George, John, and Phillip Little. Northern goalkeeper Jim Stephenson became the first person to play in six Chatham Cup finals, a feat which was to eventually be surpassed by Tony Sibley in 1982.

The match is regarded as the best final of the 1960s - and one of the best finals ever. George Little opened the scoring for Northern after just four minutes adding to goals he had scored in the 1958 and 1961 finals, but Paul Nevison equalised within seconds. The Hamilton side were 2-1 up after just seven minutes, with a goal by Trevor Jones. Jones added a second in the 37th minute, and the scoring was completed by a second Nevison strike seven minutes into the second period.

Results

Second round

* Won on corners by St. Kilda

Third round

Last 16

Last eight ("Zone finals")

*Won on corners by Nelson

Semi-finals ("Island finals")

Final

References

Rec.Sport.Soccer Statistics Foundation New Zealand 1962 page

Chatham Cup
Chatham Cup
Chatham Cup
September 1962 sports events in New Zealand